Mormyrus hildebrandti is a species of ray-finned fish in the family Mormyridae. It is endemic to Kenya.  It is threatened by habitat loss.

Sources 

Mormyrus
Fish described in 1882
Taxa named by Wilhelm Peters
Endemic freshwater fish of Kenya
Taxonomy articles created by Polbot